Patricia E. Bauman is an American mathematician who studies partial differential equations that model the behavior of liquid crystals and superconductors. She is a professor of mathematics at Purdue University.

Education and career
Bauman received her Ph.D. from the University of Minnesota in 1982, under the supervision of Eugene Fabes; her dissertation was Properties of Non-Negative Solutions of Second-Order Elliptic Equations and their Adjoints. She was a postdoctoral researcher at the Courant Institute of Mathematical Sciences and a C. L. E. Moore instructor of mathematics at the Massachusetts Institute of Technology before joining the Purdue University faculty.

Recognition
Bauman was given an AMS Centennial Fellowship for 1994 to 1995. In 2012, Bauman became a fellow of the American Mathematical Society.

She was elected chair of the Society for Industrial and Applied Mathematics Activity Group on Mathematical Aspects of Materials Science (SIAG/MS) for 2017–2019.

References

Living people
20th-century American mathematicians
21st-century American mathematicians
American women mathematicians
Fellows of the American Mathematical Society
University of Minnesota alumni
Purdue University faculty
20th-century women mathematicians
21st-century women mathematicians
Year of birth missing (living people)
20th-century American women
Massachusetts Institute of Technology School of Science faculty
21st-century American women